Kanninum Kannadikkum is a 2004 Indian Malayalam language film  directed by Sunderdas and starring Kalabhavan Mani and Monica.

Cast

Kalabhavan Mani as Praav / Maniyan
Monica as Abhirami
Siddique as Harikrishnan
Sona Nair as Radha
Jagathy Sreekumar as Pushkaran
Janardanan as Narayanan
Sudheesh as Murugan
Rajasenan in Guest Appearance
Prabhu as himself in Guest Appearance
Sukanya in Guest Appearance
Bindu Panicker as Saudamini
 Indrans as MA Chendamangalam
 Seema G. Nair as Pushkaran's wife
 KTS Padannayil as Mooppan
Bhavani as Abhirami's mother
Spadikam George as himself
Ponnamma Babu as herself
Irshad as Abhirami's husband
 Anu Joseph as Chembarathy
Gadha Salam as Jyolsyar
Vishnu Unnikrishnan 
Kozhikode Sharada
Pradeep Kottayam

Soundtrack
Music: M. Jayachandran, Lyrics: S. Ramesan Nair
 "Kaithozhaam" - K. S. Chitra 
 "Maarikolunthe Manakkanathenth" - Kalabhavan Mani 
 "Nilaakkili" - Ramesh Murali 
 "Pachakkilipadu" - K. K. Nishad 
 "Thanichirikkumbam" (F) - K. S. Chitra
 "Thanichirikkumbam" (M) - K. J. Yesudas 
 "Thanichirikkumbam" (D) - K. J. Yesudas, K. S. Chitra
 "Thennalile" (D) - M. G. Sreekumar, Sujatha Mohan 
 "Thennalile" (F) - Sujatha Mohan

Reception 
A critic from Sify criticised the film's excessive use of Tamil and praised Kalabhavan Mani's performance.

References

2004 films
2000s Malayalam-language films
Films directed by Sundar Das